Can't Buy a Thrill is the debut studio album by American rock band Steely Dan, released in November 1972 by ABC Records. The album was written by band members Donald Fagen and Walter Becker, recorded in August 1972 at the Village Recorder in Los Angeles, California and produced by Gary Katz. It features tight song structures and sounds that vary from soft rock, folk rock, and pop, alongside philosophical, elliptical lyrics.

The album was a commercial success, peaking at number 17 on the Billboard chart and eventually being certified platinum. It was also met with positive reviews and later appeared on many professional listings of the greatest albums, including Colin Larkin's All Time Top 1000 Albums (2000) and Rolling Stone magazine's "500 Greatest Albums of All Time" (2003).

Recording 
Steely Dan recorded the album in August 1972 at the Village Recorder in Los Angeles. Two songs recorded during the Can't Buy a Thrill sessions were left off the album and released as a single: "Dallas" b/w "Sail the Waterway". This is the only Steely Dan album to include David Palmer as a lead vocalist, having been recruited after Donald Fagen expressed concerns over singing live.  Drummer Jim Hodder also contributes lead vocals on one song, "Midnite Cruiser" (sometimes spelled "Midnight Cruiser"), as well as singing the "Dallas" single. By the time recording of the next album began, the band and producer Gary Katz had convinced Fagen to assume the full lead vocalist role.

Music and lyrics 
According to writers Marjorie Galen and Gordon Matthews, Can't Buy a Thrill features an upbeat soft rock style. Music journalist Paul Lester said that it incorporates mambo, swing, jazz, and Latin musical elements. Music critic Stephen Thomas Erlewine noted that "there are very few of the jazz flourishes that came to distinguish their [later] albums", but added that the first single from the album, "Do It Again", incorporates a tight Latin jazz beat, while the second single, "Reelin' In the Years", features jazzy guitar solos and harmonies. Robert Christgau described the former song as a toned-down mambo song with "tragic" lyrics about a "compulsive" loser.

"Fire in the Hole", which features "angry, strident piano" by Fagen, takes its title from a phrase used by American soldiers in Vietnam, and alludes to how so many students evaded the draft in the late 1960s and early 1970s (Becker and Fagen included).

Title and packaging 
The title of the album is a reference to the opening line of the Bob Dylan song "It Takes a Lot to Laugh, It Takes a Train to Cry". The album cover features a photomontage by Robert Lockart. It includes an image of a line of prostitutes, standing in a red-light area from Rouen in France waiting for clients, chosen because of its relevance to the album title.  Walter Becker and Donald Fagen themselves commented on the album art in their liner notes to the reissued The Royal Scam, saying that the Royal Scam album possessed "the most hideous album cover of the seventies, bar none (excepting perhaps Can't Buy a Thrill)." The cover was banned in Francisco Franco's Spain and was replaced with a photograph of the band playing in concert.

Marketing and sales 
Can't Buy a Thrill was released in the United States by ABC Records in November 1972 and in the United Kingdom by Probe Records in January 1973. The album peaked at number 17 on the Billboard Top Pop Albums, and was reissued on August 22, 1973, by Dunhill Records. On May 31, 1973, it was certified Gold by the Recording Industry Association of America (RIAA), for shipments of 500,000 copies in the US, then certified platinum by RIAA on September 7, 1993, for shipments of 1,000,000 copies in the US.

Critical reception 

Reviewing in November 1972 for Rolling Stone, James Isaacs said Can't Buy a Thrill is "distinguished by three top-level cuts and scattered moments of inspiration," but felt the band occasionally sounded "limp". Christgau deemed it "a good album attached" to a hit single in his review for Creem; he found the lyrics "oblique, even philosophical ... as befit a band named after a dildo in a William S. Burroughs novel." In Christgau's Record Guide: Rock Albums of the Seventies (1981), he expounded on his original praise: "Think of the Dan as the first post-boogie band: the beat swings more than it blasts or blisters, the chord changes defy our primitive subconscious expectations, and the lyrics underline their own difficulty—as well as the difficulty of the reality to which they refer—with arbitrary personal allusions, most of which are ruses."

In a retrospective review for AllMusic, Erlewine said the songs "subvert traditional conventions" and are "tightly constructed, with interlocking chords and gracefully interwoven melodies, buoyed by clever, cryptic lyrics." However, he critiqued that vocalist David Palmer "oversings the handful of tracks where he takes the lead", which caused Walter Becker and Donald Fagen to temper "their wildest impulses with mainstream pop techniques." Writing for BBC Music, Paul Lester said the album was so "fully-formed ... that you would scarcely believe that it's their debut", and observed "tightly constructed songs with dazzling hooks, clever, cryptic lyrics, and vocals that offer teasing critiques for those that want them." Rob Sheffield was somewhat less impressed in The Rolling Stone Album Guide (2004), regarding the record as "mellow folk rock" that was "softened" by Palmer, who "sounds like he's nervous about where his wallet is".

Can't Buy a Thrill has appeared on many professional listings of the greatest albums. In 2000, it was voted number 207 in Colin Larkin's All Time Top 1000 Albums. In 2003, Rolling Stone ranked it number 238 on their list of the 500 greatest albums of all time, and 240 in a 2012 revised list, and number 168 in a 2020 revised list. Based on such rankings, the aggregate website Acclaimed Music lists Can't Buy a Thrill as the 557th most acclaimed album in history, as well as the 154th most acclaimed from the 1970s and the 13th most acclaimed from 1972. The album was also included in the book 1001 Albums You Must Hear Before You Die.

Track listing
All songs were written by Donald Fagen and Walter Becker.

Personnel

Steely Dan
 David Palmer – lead vocals on "Dirty Work" and "Brooklyn", backing vocals
 Donald Fagen – acoustic and electric pianos, plastic (YC-30) organ, lead vocals (except on "Dirty Work", "Midnite Cruiser", and "Brooklyn"), backing vocals
 Jeff "Skunk" Baxter – guitar, pedal steel guitar, spoken word on "Only a Fool Would Say That"
 Denny Dias – guitar, electric sitar
 Walter Becker – electric bass, backing vocals
 Jim Hodder – drums, percussion, lead vocal on "Midnite Cruiser", backing vocals

Additional musicians
 Elliott Randall – lead guitar on "Kings" and "Reelin in the Years" 
 Jerome Richardson – tenor saxophone
 Snooky Young – flugelhorn
 Victor Feldman – percussion
 Venetta Fields, Clydie King, Sherlie Matthews – backing vocals on "Brooklyn" and "Kings"

Technical
 Gary Katz – producer
 Roger Nichols – engineer
 Tim Weston – assistant engineer
 Doug Sax – mastering engineer
 Robert Lockart – cover design

Reissue
 Reissue producers: Walter Becker, Donald Fagen
 Remastering: Roger Nichols
 Art direction: Vartan
 Liner notes: Tristan Fabriani (Walter Becker & Donald Fagen)
 Reissue design: Red Herring Design, New York City
 Consultant: Daniel Levitin

Charts

Pop singles

References

Notes

Bibliography

External links
 Complete lyrics

Steely Dan albums
1972 debut albums
ABC Records albums
Albums produced by Gary Katz